Jordan William Fisher (born April 24, 1994) is an American actor, singer, and dancer. He began his career with recurring roles on several television series, including The Secret Life of the American Teenager in 2012 and Liv and Maddie from 2015 to 2017. He also had supporting roles in the television films Teen Beach Movie (2013), Teen Beach 2 (2015) and Grease Live (2016), and starred in Rent: Live (2019).

Fisher and his dancing partner Lindsay Arnold won the 25th season of Dancing with the Stars (2017). He subsequently hosted Dancing with the Stars: Juniors in 2018, and commentated the 2019 Fortnite World-Cup. As a singer, his self-titled EP was released by Hollywood Records in 2016.

On Broadway, Fisher portrayed John Laurens/Philip Hamilton in Hamilton from 2016 to 2017, and took on the lead role of Evan Hansen in Dear Evan Hansen in 2020. He has also starred in the 2020 Netflix films To All the Boys: P.S. I Still Love You and Work It. Fisher is also fairly well-known for his role as Sea Hawk in She-Ra and the Princesses of Power.

Early life and education
Fisher was born in Birmingham, Alabama in 1994 and grew up in nearby Trussville. Jordan's biological mother was 16 at the time of his birth, and he was legally adopted in 2005 at age 11 and raised by his maternal grandparents, Rodney and Pat Fisher. The Fishers also adopted Jordan's two siblings, Cory and Trinity, as their mother struggled with substance abuse – she did not have a relationship with the children. During an interview with Hollywood Today Live, Fisher revealed his multi-ethnic background of Nigerian, Cambodian, English, Polynesian (Tahitian), Italian, Greek, and Scandinavian origin.

Fisher became involved in gymnastics at age 2 and mail delivery age 11. He became interested in musical theater in the fifth grade, after being cast in a school production of School House Rock, Jr. Fisher was home-schooled as a child and earned a high school diploma from Harvest Christian Academy. He joined the Red Mountain Theatre Company in Birmingham and was part of their youth performing ensemble for many years. There, he was spotted by a talent scout who offered to represent him. He enrolled in courses at Jacksonville State University in 2011. Later that year, he moved to Los Angeles, California, with his grandparents and siblings.

Career
In 2014, Fisher released three pop-soul songs on Radio Disney: "By Your Side", "Never Dance Alone" and "What I Got". In 2015, he signed a record deal with Hollywood Records. On February 1, 2016, he released "Counterfeit", his first track for the label. The release of this single was delayed while he completed his delivery person contract with the United States Postal Service.

Fisher's first single, "All About Us", was released on April 15, 2016, and produced by Warren "Oak" Felder of the production duo Pop & Oak. The song's music video, directed by TK McKamy, premiered on Vibe.com on May 11, 2016. For the week of June 13, 2016, "All About Us" ranked as the second-most added song on pop radio stations. It is the first track on Fisher's self-titled EP, which was released on August 19, 2016. He has referred to the EP's sound as pop-soul-R&B, influenced by '80s soul music. Fisher plays six instruments: piano, guitar, bass, harmonica, French horn and drums.

In 2015, Fisher joined Disney Channel Circle of Stars for a remake of the song "Do You Want to Build a Snowman?" from the film Frozen. For his role on Liv and Maddie, he sang both a duet and ballad version of the song "True Love", which appeared on the show's soundtrack in 2015. He contributed two tracks, "Fallin' For Ya" and "Wanna Be With You", along with vocals on three others, to the Teen Beach 2 soundtrack, released in 2015. He is also featured on Olivia Holt's self-titled debut EP on "Thin Air". On March 13, 2016, he sang the national anthem before the NASCAR Good Sam 500 stock car race at the Phoenix International Raceway in Avondale, Arizona. At the 2016 Apple Music Festival in London, Fisher opened for Alicia Keys. Fisher is featured alongside Lin-Manuel Miranda on "You're Welcome", an end-credits song for the 2016 animated Disney film Moana. In July 2016, he was picked as Elvis Duran's Artist of the Month and was featured on NBC's Today show hosted by Kathie Lee Gifford and Hoda Kotb and broadcast nationally where he performed live his single "All About Us". He covered the 1971 Ten Years After song "I'd Love to Change the World" for the 2017 ABC miniseries When We Rise. Fisher has performed at numerous WE Day concerts across the United States, to benefit WE Charity.

Fisher's single "Mess" was released on October 6, 2017.
In 2019, he released his single "Be Okay".
In 2020, he released two singles, "Contact" and "Walking on the Ceiling".

Television
Fisher's first television roles were in 2009 as a guest star on The Hustler on Crackle and iCarly on Nickelodeon. His first major part was as Grace Bowman's half-brother Jacob on seasons 4 and 5 of ABC Family's The Secret Life of the American Teenager. He portrayed the recurring character Holden Dippledorf on Liv and Maddie on the Disney Channel starting in 2015, and has also appeared in The Thundermans and Teen Wolf. He played the surfer gang leader Seacat in the cable TV movies Teen Beach Movie (2013) and Teen Beach 2 (2015). On Grease: Live, a live performance of Grease televised on Fox, Fisher starred as Doody, opposite Carly Rae Jepsen as his girlfriend Frenchy. He sings a rendition of "Those Magic Changes" that was widely praised as a highlight of the show.   In September 2017, Fisher began competing as one of the celebrities on the 25th season of Dancing with the Stars. His professional partner was Lindsay Arnold. On November 21, Fisher and Arnold reached the finals, and were declared the winners of the season.

From 2018 to 2020, Fisher voiced the character of Sea Hawk in She-Ra and the Princesses of Power.  

In 2019, Fisher appeared in another musical production on Fox, this time Rent: Live, as Mark Cohen.

In 2020, he appeared on the Disney Family Singalong.

On March 30, 2021, it was confirmed that Fisher would be portraying Bart Allen / Impulse on the CW superhero series, The Flash. He has also guest starred in High School Musical: The Musical: The Series, playing the role of Gina's older brother, Jamie.

From 2021 to 2022, Fisher voiced MC Grillz, a famous rapper who is the host of a popular rapping competition, in the animated series Karma's World.

In 2022, Fisher voiced the lead character Wilbur in the HBO Max animated musical Naked Mole Rat Gets Dressed: The Underground Rock Experience.

Theatre
Fisher made his Broadway debut in Hamilton on November 22, 2016, assuming the roles of John Laurens and Philip Hamilton from Anthony Ramos. His final performance was March 5, 2017. In 2019, he participated in a workshop of MJ the Musical, playing the role of Michael Jackson. On January 28, 2020 he returned to Broadway, taking over the title role in the Tony Award-winning musical Dear Evan Hansen. 
In 2023, he is seen as Anthony Hope in Sweeney Todd: The Demon Barber of Fleet Street.

Film
In 2019, he was cast as John Ambrose McClaren in To All the Boys: P.S. I Still Love You. In 2020, he portrayed the role of Jake Taylor in the Netflix Original movie Work It.
 In April 2021, it was announced that he had been cast in the upcoming film Field Notes on Love as Hugo, starring alongside Liv and Maddie co-star Dove Cameron.

Personal life
Fisher is married to his childhood sweetheart Ellie Woods. They announced their engagement on May 29, 2019 and were going to get married on July 25, 2020, but the wedding was delayed due to COVID-19. They married on November 21, 2020 in a private ceremony at Walt Disney World. In December 2021, the couple announced via Instagram that they are expecting their first child, a son. On June 7, 2022, the couple welcomed a son named Riley William.

Discography

Soundtrack albums

Extended plays

Singles

As featured artist

Promotional singles

Other charted songs

Other appearances

Music videos

Filmography

Stage

Advertisements

Awards and nominations

References

External links 
 Official website

Living people
1994 births
Male actors from Birmingham, Alabama
American adoptees
American male film actors
American male television actors
American male voice actors
American male video game actors
African-American male singers
American male singer-songwriters
American male pop singers
American soul singers
American people of Cambodian descent
American people of English descent
American people of Greek descent
American people of Italian descent
American people of Nigerian descent
American people of Polynesian descent
American people of Scandinavian descent
Hollywood Records artists
Dancing with the Stars (American TV series) winners
21st-century American singers
Twitch (service) streamers
American singer-songwriters
African-American songwriters